Vernon Edward Miles was a college football player for the VPI Gobblers, captain of the 1927 team, and selected All-Southern.

References

American football guards
Virginia Tech Hokies football players
All-Southern college football players